Gymnastics competitions at the 2022 South American Youth Games in Rosario, Argentina were held from April 28 to May 2, 2022.

Medal summary

Medal table

Medalists

Boys

Girls

See also
2022 South American Artistic Gymnastics Championships

References

South American Youth Games
Gymnastics
2022 South American Youth Games